Senator Sanborn may refer to:

Alan Sanborn (born 1957), Michigan State Senate
Albert W. Sanborn (1853–1937), Wisconsin State Senate
Andy Sanborn (fl. 2010s), New Hampshire State Senate
Heather Sanborn (fl. 2010s), Maine State Senate
John B. Sanborn (1826–1904), Minnesota State Senate
Linda Sanborn (born 1951), Maine State Senate